King of the Nerds is a British reality competition series co-produced by Electus and Objective Productions. Based on the American series of the same name, the show features nerds and geeks competing in challenges for a £15,000 prize and the title of "King of the Nerds". It is hosted by television presenter and writer Konnie Huq. The series premiered on Sky 1 on 12 July 2015.

Premise
Following roughly the same format as the American series, King of the Nerds follows several contestants as they compete in various challenges testing their intellect, ingenuity, skills, and pop-culture prowess. The competitors live together in one house, named "Nerdvana", initially competing as teams before proceeding to individual challenges. In each episode, the contestants compete in a challenge called the "Nerd War". The winner(s) of the Nerd War are granted immunity from elimination. Two losing players are then selected to compete in a head-to-head elimination challenge called the "Nerd-Off"; one player is selected by vote between the losers of the Nerd War, while the other is selected by the winner(s).

Unlike its US counterpart, which features different challenges for each Nerd-Off, the UK version uses a single, quiz bowl-style challenge. The Nerd-Off consists of two rounds. In the Wild Card round, the two nerds compete simultaneously to answer questions about a mystery topic. In the Quick Fire round, the contestants, taking turns, are given 90 seconds to answer as many questions as possible on a subject chosen by their opponent. The person with the fewest points by the end of both rounds is eliminated from the competition. In the event of a tie, the contestants are given one final "killer question". One contestant is eliminated in each episode until the finale, where the last remaining competitor is crowned the "King of the Nerds", claims the Throne of Games (a reference to the television series Game of Thrones), and wins the show's £15,000 prize.

Development and production
Sky 1 announced that it had ordered an adaptation of King of the Nerds for the United Kingdom on 31 July 2014. The UK version, which received an order for eight episodes, was co-produced by Objective Productions and Electus and filmed at Felsted School in Felsted, England. Electus International distributed the UK series, alongside the format and the US series. The first series was originally scheduled to air in October 2014; however, the premiere was delayed to 2015 due to unspecified reasons.

Series 1 (2015)

Contestants

Contestant progress

: Curtis switched from Team Defenders of Time to Team E.V.I.L. 
: Teams were dissolved and Nerd Wars became individual challenges. 
: The losers of the final Nerd War were automatically eliminated.
Key
 (WINNER) The contestant won the competition and was crowned "King of the Nerds".
 (RUNNER-UP) The contestant was the runner-up in the competition.
 (WIN) The contestant won the Nerd War and received immunity from elimination.
 (IN) The contestant lost the Nerd War, but was not selected to compete in the Nerd-Off.
 (RISK) The contestant won the Nerd-Off and escaped elimination.
 (OUT) The contestant lost the Nerd-Off and was eliminated from the competition.
Teams
 The contestant was a member of Team Defenders of Time.
 The contestant was a member of Team E.V.I.L. (Extremely Valiant Independence League).

Episodes

References

External links

British television series based on American television series
2010s British reality television series
2015 British television series debuts
2015 British television series endings
Nerd culture
Television series by All3Media
Sky UK original programming
English-language television shows